In mathematics, a Rothberger space is a topological space that satisfies a certain a basic selection principle.

History 

Characterizations

Combinatorial characterization 
For subsets of the real line, the Rothberger property can be characterized using continuous functions into the Baire space . A subset of the real line is Rothberger iff every continuous image of that space into the Baire space is guessable.

Topological game characterization 
Let  be a topological space.

Bob chooses a set .

Bob chooses a finite set .

etc.

If the family  is a cover of the space , then Bob wins the game . Otherwise, Alice wins.

A player has a winning strategy if he knows how to play in order to win the game  (formally, a winning strategy is a function).
 A topological space is Rothberger iff Alice has no winning strategy in the game  played on this space.
 Let  be a metric space. Bob has a winning strategy in the game  played on the space  iff the space  is countable.

Properties 
 Every countable topological space is Rothberger
 Every Luzin set is Rothberger
 Every Rothberger subset of the real line has strong measure zero.
 In the Laver model for the consistency of the Borel conjecture every Rothberger subset of the real line is countable

References 

Properties of topological spaces
Topology